The Legislative Assembly of Saint Petersburg is the regional parliament of Saint Petersburg, a federal subject (federal city) of Russia. It was established in 1994, succeeding the Leningrad Council of People Deputies (Lensovet).

It is a permanent body, and the supreme and only governing body in St Petersburg. It is located in the Mariinsky Palace. Its powers and duties are defined in the Charter of Saint Petersburg.

History

Russian Empire

Saint Petersburg's city duma was established in 1786 as part of Catherine II's reforms on local government.

In 1798, Paul I abolished the city duma and replaced it with the Ratusha (Rathaus) until the city duma was restored in 1802. The city duma was again abolished in 1918 with its functions devolved to the Petrograd Soviet.

Russian Federation
Initially it was the speaker of the Assembly who served as member of the Federation Council of Russia representing the legislative power body of this federal subject.  However, in 2000 the federal legislation changed and the duties were delegated to a separate person to be elected by the regional legislature (not necessarily among its members).  From June 13, 2001 until May 18, 2011, Sergey Mironov occupied this position.

According to federal legislation from 2005, the governor of Saint Petersburg (as well as heads of other federal subjects of Russia) was proposed by the President of Russia and approved by the regional legislature.  On December 20, 2006, incumbent Valentina Matviyenko was approved as governor. In 2012, following the passage of a new federal law, which restored direct elections of the heads of federal subjects, the city charter was again amended.

Convocations 
The first three convocations were formed by a single-member district plurality voting system with at least 20% participation required (except for the 1994 elections with their changing participation threshold), two-round for the first and second convocations and single-round for the third one.  On March 11, 2007, the fourth elections were held using a party-list proportional representation system with a 7-percent election threshold and no required threshold of participation for the first time according to the new city law accepted by the third convocation of the assembly in 2006 and new federal legislation.

1st convocation: March 20–21/October 30/November 20, 1994
2nd convocation: December 6/December 20, 1998
3rd convocation: December 8, 2002
4th convocation: March 11, 2007
5th convocation: December 4, 2011
6th convocation: September 18, 2016
7th convocation: September 2021 – September 2026

Composition 
The Assembly is a permanent body, and the supreme and only governing body in St Petersburg. It consists of fifty seats and is elected for a five-year term. Half of this number run in single-mandate constituencies, while the other half are in a single electoral district, with winners elected in proportion to the number of votes cast. The candidates are nominated by electoral associations.

Structure and governor
The highest executive body of state power in St Petersburg is the government of St Petersburg, headed by the Governor of St Petersburg, who is the region's highest-ranking official. The Governor is elected for five years by Russian citizens who live in St Petersburg permanently.

, the term of office of the incumbent Governor expires in September 2024.

Past compositions

2011

2016

2021 

Controversy 

While non-systemic opposition was largely eliminated from the elections, those candidates (mostly of systemic opposition) who were allowed to participate were targeted by various semi-legal intimidation or confusion techniques. The one includes "doppelganger candidates", where a person of similar look and surname was put on the same ballot in order to confuse voters. Both have changed their legal names to "Boris Vishnevsky" shortly before the elections, and returned to their original names shortly after it was finished.

Speakers

Footnotes

References

Government of Saint Petersburg
Saint Petersburg
Saint Petersburg
1994 establishments in Russia